Samvel Darbinyan is an Armenian football coach who is currently the manager of Ararat Yerevan.

References

Living people
Sportspeople from Yerevan
Armenian football managers
Armenia national football team managers
Expatriate football managers in Iran
FC Ararat Yerevan managers
FC Pyunik managers
FC Mika managers
Zob Ahan Esfahan F.C. managers
Soviet Armenians
1952 births
Armenian expatriate football managers
Armenian expatriate sportspeople in Iran
Persian Gulf Pro League managers